The Streets of San Francisco is an American TV series.

Streets of San Francisco may also refer to:
Streets of San Francisco (film), 1949 American crime drama
The Streets of San Francisco (album), 1995 American LP

See also
List of streets in San Francisco